The 1937–38 season was the 63rd season of competitive football in England.

Overview
Manchester City became the only team to have been relegated in the season after winning the league title as well as the only team to ever be relegated from the top tier of English football having scored the most goals in that particular season.

The points spread between the league champions, Arsenal, and the team that finished bottom of the league, West Bromwich Albion, was a mere 16 points.

Arsenal won the title (the club's fifth) on the final day of the season with a mere 52 points from 42 matches after beating Bolton Wanderers 5-0 at Highbury, whilst the table leaders after the penultimate round of fixtures, Wolverhampton Wanderers, lost 1-0 to 10-man Sunderland at Roker Park to be denied what would have otherwise been their first-ever league title. Wolves, who nonetheless achieved a new club record by finishing as league runners-up for the first time in their history, would have to wait until 1953-54 to win their first English league title, although by that time they would have already experienced once again the pain of being pipped to another potential league title on the final day of a season - this time by Liverpool in 1946-47.

Honours

Notes = Number in parentheses is the times that club has won that honour. * indicates new record for competition

Football League

First Division

Second Division

Third Division North

Third Division South

Top goalscorers

First Division
Tommy Lawton (Everton) – 28 goals

Second Division
George Henson (Bradford Park Avenue) – 27 goals

Third Division North
Jack Roberts (Port Vale) – 28 goals

Third Division South
Harold Crawshaw (Mansfield Town) – 25 goals

National team
A tour to central Europe was successful as the England squad comprehensively beat Germany in front of Adolf Hitler and Joseph Goebbels in Berlin as well as defeating France in Paris. However, between these successes was another defeat; to Switzerland. The tour was considered very controversial as the players were instructed to give the German leaders the Nazi salute during the anthems before the kick-off of the match in Berlin.

European tour

References

 

no:Engelsk 1. divisjon 1937–38